Anderson Lim Chee Wei (born 27 September 1995) is a Bruneian former competitive swimmer. He was the first Bruneian swimmer to compete at the Olympics, representing his country in the 2012 London Summer Olympics. Lim is also the founder of Nimanja.com, which is the first pet supply e-retailer in Brunei.

Lim's early years of education were spent at Jerudong International School in Brunei. He left for the United States in 2011 after securing an Olympic Scholarship from the Brunei Darussalam National Olympic Council. From 2011 to 2013, Lim was based in Jacksonville, Florida where he was enrolled at swimming powerhouse Bolles School.

Lim is currently studying at the University of Rochester in Upstate New York. Prior to his final year at University, Lim started Nimanja.com with the goal of "bring[ing] convenience to pet lovers in Brunei by offering a wide selection of quality pet supplies through an online platform". Today, Nimanja.com has become one of the Sultanate's largest online retailers.

Biography 
Anderson Lim competed at the 2012 Summer Olympics in the Men's 200-metre freestyle, finishing in 40th place in the heats but failing to qualify for the semifinals.

Lim holds five Brunei National swimming records: 200 m butterfly, 200 m freestyle, 400 m freestyle and 1500 m freestyle.

He also completed at the 2011 World Aquatics Championships in the 200 metre and 400 metre freestyle events, where he failed to advance to the semifinals.

See also 
 List of swimmers
 Brunei at the 2011 World Aquatics Championships
 Brunei at the 2012 Summer Olympics

References 

1995 births
Living people
Bruneian people of Chinese descent
Bruneian male swimmers
Swimmers at the 2012 Summer Olympics
Olympic swimmers of Brunei
Bruneian expatriates in the United States
Sportspeople of Chinese descent